Howells Opera House is a historic opera house located in Oakley, Idaho, on Blaine Street. The opera house is registered with the Idaho State Historical Society. The Opera house was built by the first prosecuting attorney for Cassia County, Judge B.P. (Benjamin Price) Howells. The building construction began in 1904 and was completed in 1907 for the cost of $22,000 ($757,000 adjusted for inflation today). The opera House is currently owned and operated by the Oakley Valley Arts Council. It has been known by several names, including the Oakley Playhouse (c. 1907), Cassia County Playhouse (c. 1929), and most notably as the Howells Opera House.

Description 
The opera house has a square gable false front with a central door flanked by segmental-arched openings. The building was constructed using a local variety of quartzite referred to as Oakley stone. The performance floor features seating for around 300 people.

Performance history 
The Oakley Valley Arts Council has kept a record of performances from 1974 to the present. Past performances include such operas as The Diary of Anne Frank, The Mikado, and The Pirates of Penzance.

Oakley Valley Arts Council 
During the 1970s, when the opera house had fallen into a state of disrepair and demolition of the house was being discussed, the performing arts community within Oakley formed the Oakley Valley Arts Council and purchased the house. Today the Oakley Valley Arts Council continues to put on seasonal performances here.

Ghostlore 
The opera house is the subject of several ghostlore stories. One story suggests that there is a female apparition with black hair who can be seen watching the performances from behind the stage. Another story relates that an older gentleman's ghost can be seen stalking the grounds of the house, with some variations suggesting that this particular ghost is that of original owner, Benjamin Howells.

References 

Buildings and structures in Cassia County, Idaho
Buildings and structures completed in 1907
Theatres in Idaho
Music venues in Idaho
Opera houses in Idaho